Where Are You My Love? may refer to:

 "Where Are You My Love", a song by Eddie Low
 "Où es-tu mon amour? (Where Are You, My Love?)", a song written by Emile Stern and Henri Lemarchand in 1946
 ¿Dónde estás amor de mi vida que no te puedo encontrar? (Where Are You My Love, That I Cannot Find You?), a 1992 Argentine drama film

See also
Are You My Love? (disambiguation)
"Where Are You Now (My Love)", a 1965 song written by Tony Hatch and Jackie Trent
"Where Is My Love", a song from the 2006 Cat Power album, The Greatest